Janseana is a genus of moths belonging to the family Tineidae.

Species
Janseana sceptica 	(Meyrick, 1910)
Janseana vibrata (Meyrick, 1913)

References

Gozmány L. A. & Vári L. 1973. The Tineidae of the Ethiopian Region. - Transvaal Museum Memoir 18:i–vi, 1–238.

Myrmecozelinae
Tineidae genera